José David Weinstein Cañuela (born 13 July 1959) is a Chilean politician, sociologist and scholar who served as President of the National Council of Culture and the Arts during Ricardo Lagos' government (2000−2006).

References

External links
 Profile at Diego Portales University

1959 births
Living people
Chilean people
Chilean people of German-Jewish descent
Chilean people of Spanish descent
Chilean sociologists
University of Chile alumni
Catholic University of Leuven alumni
Party for Democracy (Chile) politicians